Coldwater Township is the name of some places in the U.S. state of Michigan:

 Coldwater Township, Branch County, Michigan
 Coldwater Township, Isabella County, Michigan

See also 
 Coldwater Township (disambiguation)

Michigan township disambiguation pages